Blackshaw is a civil parish in the metropolitan borough of Calderdale, West Yorkshire, England.   It contains 45 listed buildings that are recorded in the National Heritage List for England.  Of these, one is at Grade II*, the middle of the three grades, and the others are at Grade II, the lowest grade.  The parish contains the small settlements of Blackshaw Head, Charlestown, and Colden, and is otherwise rural.  Most of the listed buildings are houses and cottages, farmhouses, and farm buildings.  The other listed buildings include bridges, a tenter ground and apiary, a public house, a guide post, a milestone, and a boundary stone.


Key

Buildings

References

Citations

Sources

Lists of listed buildings in West Yorkshire